Below is a partial list of shows that were aired on the now-defunct Philippine television network, Banahaw Broadcasting Corporation (relaunched as City 2 Television) from 1973 following the declaration of Martial law by then-President Ferdinand Marcos until 1986 during the height of EDSA Revolution to make way for the return of ABS-CBN with flagship station DWWX-TV.

Final programming

Newscasts
 BBC/City 2 Balita 
 BBC/City 2 Balita Late-Night Edition

Drama

Series
 Alindog 
 Blu: Bernardo, Lorenzo, Ulysses 
 Eliza 
 Ginang Milyonarya 
 Gulong ng Palad 
 Ilaw ng Tahanan

Anthologies
 Carmi  
 Dulambuhay ni Rosa Vilma
 Lovingly Yours, Helen 
 Nagmamahal, Amalia 
 Panahon 
 True Confessions ng mga Bituin

Variety
 Ariel and Co. after Six 
 The Big, Big Show 
 Karnabal Dos 
 Disco, Disco
 Celeste
 Big Ike's Happening...Now!
 Broadcast Campus
 I Am What I Am 
 Kalatog Pinggan
 Ladies and Gentlemen... 
 Love Lea
 Odyssey 2
 Okey Sha!
 Sapak na Sapak Talaga! 
 The Pilita and Jackie Show
 Tang-tarang-tang
 Teen Pan Alley 
 VIP (Vilma in Person)

Talk
 Daigdig ng mga Misis
 Coffee with Lee Andres
 In-Daing (1979–1980)
 JQ on Cue
 Nothing But the Truth
 The Star with Lolit Solis(1975-1976)
  Tell the City

Comedy
 2 Plus 2
 Apartment 153-A
 Banana Sundae 
 Bisoy
 Buhok-Pinoy
 Ang Lola kong Baduy
 Mah Tah Tu
 Nanette Por Kilo
 Prrrt... Foul! 
 Tepok Bunot

Game
 Astro Quiz Show
 Kiddie Pow!
 Kuarta o Kahon 
 TV Powww

Public affairs
 Progress '85

Sports
 PBA on BBC (1976)
 PBA on Vintage Sports (1982-1983)

Religious
 Ang Iglesia ni Cristo 
Jesus I Trust in You!: The 3:00 pm Prayer Habit 
 Sharing In the City

Film and special presentation
 BBC Afternoon Theater
 Mga Anino ng Kahapon
 Monday Suspense Theater
 The Movie Tonight
 The 4:00 am Movie

Others
 City 2 Long
 Dos Por Dos
 Manila Files (1981)
 Peping
 PST (1984–1986)
 Rico Baby
 Tawag-Pansin
 Weekend Thriller
 MV2 (The World of Music Videos)

Movie trailers
 Movie Parade

Acquired programming

Drama

American
 Police Story 
 The Bionic Woman
 Moonlighting 
 The Young and the Restless

British
 Dr. Who

Animated/*(Cartoon City)
 Hans Christian Andersen
 The All-New Popeye Show*
 Birdman and the Galaxy Trio*
 Groovie Goolies*
 Harlem Globetrotters
 Josie and the Pussycats
 Pac-Man
 Wait Till Your Father Gets Home
 The Transformers

Comedy
 Abbott and Costello
 Batman & Robin
 The Bob Newhart Show
 Me and Maxx
 The Facts of Life
 Sigmund and the Sea Monsters
 The Three Stooges

Sports
 NFL on City2/BBC

Documentary / magazine
 Lifeline

Informative
 Sesame Street 
 Candid Camera
 The Electric Company
 The Edison Twins 
 Dr. Shrinker
 Double Deckers
 The Krofft Supershow 
 Make Me Laugh
 Marlo and the Magic Movie Machine
 News from Zoos

References

See also
 Banahaw Broadcasting Corporation
 ABS-CBN
 List of Philippine television shows

Banahaw Broadcasting Corporation original programming
Television in Metro Manila
Banahaw Broadcasting Corporation
Philippine television-related lists